Jiří Janoušek (born 17 November 1989) is a professional Czech football player who currently plays for MFK Chrudim.

References

External links
 Profile at Hradec Králové website

1989 births
Living people
Czech footballers
Czech First League players
FC Hradec Králové players

Association football midfielders
FK Varnsdorf players
FK Fotbal Třinec players
MFK Chrudim players
Czech National Football League players